Sennertionyx is a genus of mites in the family Acaridae.

Scientific name: Sennertionyx 
Rank: GENUS

Lineage

 cellular organisms
 Eukaryota
 Opisthokonta
 Metazoa
 Eumetazoa
 Bilateria
 Coelomata
 Protostomia
 Panarthropoda
 Arthropoda
 Chelicerata
 Arachnida
 Acari
 Acariformes
 Sarcoptiformes
 Astigmata
 Acaroidea
 Acaridae
 Horstiinae

Species
 Sennertionyx manicati (Giard, 1900)

References

Acaridae